Suryadevara Radha Krishna, also known as S. Radha Krishna and Chinna Babu, is an Indian film producer known for his works in Telugu cinema. He produces films under his banner Haarika & Hassine Creations. Even though Sithara Entertainments is his banner, his nephew, Suryadevara Naga Vamsi, mainly produces the films under the banner, while he presents them.

He made his film debut in 1988 by producing Aathma Kadha, a Telugu remake of Mahesh Bhatt's 1985 film Janam. Years later, he associated with producer DVV Danayya, where he presented Julayi (2012), while Radha Krishna presented Cameraman Gangatho Rambabu (2012) and Naayak (2013). He then went on to form a long association with Trivikram Srinivas from Julayi (2012) and later produced his S/O Satyamurthy (2015), A Aa (2016), Agnyaathavaasi (2018), Aravinda Sametha Veera Raghava (2018), and Ala Vaikunthapurramuloo (2020).

Filmography
 As producer

 As presenter

References

External links 

Living people
People from Guntur district
Film producers from Andhra Pradesh
Telugu film producers
Year of birth missing (living people)